Professional wrestling has accrued a considerable amount of jargon throughout its existence. Much of it stems from the industry's origins in the days of carnivals and circuses. In the past, professional wrestlers used such terms in the presence of fans so as not to reveal the  nature of the business. Into the 21st century, widespread discussion on the Internet has popularized these terms. Many of the terms refer to the financial aspects of professional wrestling in addition to in-ring terms.

A

B

C

D

E

F

G

H

I

J

K

L

M

N

O

P

R

S

T

U

V

W

X

Y

Z

References

Sources

 Beekman, Scott. Ringside: A history of professional wrestling in America (Greenwood, 2006)
 
 
 Kerrick, George E. "The jargon of professional wrestling". American Speech (1980): 142–145. JSTOR
 
 Mazer, Sharon. Professional wrestling: sport and spectacle (Univ. Press of Mississippi, 1998)
 Murray, Thomas E. "The language of bodybuilding". American Speech (1984): 195–206. in JSTOR

External links 
 Total Wrestling Terms
 

Professional wrestling terms
Wikipedia glossaries using description lists